The Houston Hotshots are a professional   indoor soccer team in Houston, Texas. They play in the Premier Arena Soccer League (PASL)    From 1994 to 1997 and 2000–2001, the Houston Hotshots were a full professional indoor soccer team in Houston, Texas. They played in the Continental Indoor Soccer League (CISL) from 1994 to 1997, and moved to the World Indoor Soccer League in 1999 after the CISL folded. The Hotshots folded in early 2001 after failing to attract new investors.  On June 28, 2015, William Alsobrook filed the necessary paperwork to revive the club and announced his intention to field a team in the upcoming Premier Arena Soccer League season.

History
They were coached by Chico Borja (1994) and Trevor Dawkins (1995–97 and 1999–2000), and played at the Compaq Center and Reliant Arena. The Hotshots averaged attendance of 5,607 fans per game in six seasons of play.  In June 1994, Matt and Shannon Presley became the first husband and wife to play together in a professional soccer game.

In the first official game in the PASL Creighton Brooks scored a hat-trick vs Brownsville Barracudas on December 20, 2015.

Year-by-year

Former players
 Arash Noamouz (1995)
 Paul Dougherty (1996–97)

Awards and honors
Championships
CISL (Runner-up) (2): 1996, 1997 
 
MVP Of the Year
CISL (1997): Paul Dougherty

Rookie Of the Year
CISL (1997): Goran Vasic
WISL (2000): Clint Regier

Coach Of the Year
CISL (1996): Trevor Dawkins

References

External links 
Official website

Soccer clubs in Texas
Soccer clubs in Houston
Continental Indoor Soccer League teams
World Indoor Soccer League teams
1994 establishments in Texas
2000 disestablishments in Texas
2015 establishments in Texas
Association football clubs established in 1994
Association football clubs disestablished in 2000
Association football clubs established in 2015